Absolute First Album is the first studio album and debut Korean release by South Korean girl group T-ara. It was released on November 27, 2009, through Core Contents Media. T-ara sought to showcase "two different charms" through Absolute First Album, one embracing a "trendy" image and the other leaning towards a "classic" aesthetic. The result is a modern dance record with traces of retro influences. Absolute First Album features contributions by Shinsadong Tiger, Cho Young-soo, Choi Kyu-sung (now of Black Eyed Pilseung), Wheesung and "Hitman" Bang.

The album was preceded by the hit single "TTL (Time to Love)", with its two lead tracks, "Bo Peep Bo Peep" and "Like the First Time", becoming commercial successes as well. "Bo Peep Bo Peep" was a breakthrough single for T-ara, further attaining recognition as one of their signature songs. Absolute First Album peaked at number two on the Gaon Chart and has received positive reviews.

The success of Absolute First Album lead to T-ara's newcomer wins at the Golden Disc and Seoul Music Awards. The album was re-released as Breaking Heart on February 23, 2010, spawning "You Drive Me Crazy" which became T-ara's first number-one single. The reissue was nominated for Disk Bonsang and Popularity Award at the Golden Disc Awards.

Background and promotion
T-ara was formed by Core Contents Media CEO Kim Kwang-soo, and prior to commencing their activities as a sextet, two members bowed out after contributing a song to the Cinderella Man soundtrack, citing creative differences. The label brought in three new members and released their debut single "Lie" (Geojitmal) on July 27, 2009. The song was composed by Cho Young-soo, who would become a frequent collaborator of the group.

T-ara's debut was made amid an influx of girl groups on the Korean pop music scene, and a writer for weekly magazine SisaIN remarked that the old-school trot influence of "Lie" did little to appeal to core consumers of the girl group market; those who found nostalgia in 1990s groups like S.E.S. and Fin.K.L. The group utilized a "girlish and pure" image during its run. T-ara would find wider success with their Supernova collaboration "TTL (Time to Love)", a track influenced by southern hip hop. The single was marketed as a "180-degree transformation" of the group, who took on a "sexier" image compared to their debut.

In October 2009, the group revealed their plans for a mini-album release in the coming months. Expanding into a full-length studio album, Absolute First Album was formally announced days prior to its late November release. Core Contents Media brought on Shinsadong Tiger and "Hitman" Bang to produce songs for the album. The marketing for Absolute First Album revolved around its dual concepts; with T-ara's intent to appeal through "two different charms", the group released two lead singles simultaneously: "Bo Peep Bo Peep" was backed by a "charismatic" image, whereas "Like the First Time" (Cheoeum Cheoreom) was billed as "colorful yet classic".

Absolute First Album was digitally released on November 27, 2009. A physical release followed on December 4, 2009. Upon the album's release, Core Contents Media conducted an online poll in order to determine which lead single to promote first. Nearly 9,000 respondents from Melon, Cyworld, and Soribada, among others, were given the choice between "Bo Peep Bo Peep" and "Like the First Time", the latter of which won the poll by 53 percent. However, management proceeded with promotions for "Bo Peep Bo Peep" as the label intended to present a "180-degree transformation" of T-ara's image. The group began performing on Korea's televised music programs with the December 4, 2009, broadcast of Music Bank. "Like the First Time" was subsequently promoted in January 2010, yet their appearances quickly ceased as main vocalist So-yeon contracted H1N1, as did promotions for Absolute First Album as a whole.

Composition 
Absolute First Album is primarily a dance-pop and electronic record. Member So-yeon remarked that though "idol music [follows] the latest trend", adult listeners would be "at ease" with songs such as "Like the First Time", "Apple is A" or "You You You" (Neo Neo Neo), as they have ppong (뽕) melodies that "stimulate emotion". Its lead single, "Bo Peep Bo Peep", is billed as a "trendy" dance song with a "funky" rhythm; Spin magazine describes it as "robotic". The song is one of several that feature repetitive hooks, including "Tic Tic Toc". The album dips into "retro" territory as evident on "Lie", which is derived from trot, and "Like the First Time", which employs 1980s influences. T-ara sings in falsetto on the latter track, and parts of its electronic production is "reminiscent" of Aphex Twin and Humming Urban Stereo. Furthermore, "Like the First Time" has been compared to "In for the Kill" by English synthpop act La Roux.

"You Drive Me Crazy" (Neo Ttaemune Michyeo), from the Breaking Heart re-issue, is an "edgy" electropop song which has received comparisons to "If U Seek Amy" by American singer Britney Spears. It has been called a "song without breaks" and is highlighted for the "important key role" that synthesizers play in "creating a hook song". Elsewhere, T-ara explores R&B on "Falling U", southern hip hop on "TTL (Time to Love)", and house music on "TTL Listen 2".

Singles 
Absolute First Album collects each T-ara single prior to its release, though they were not utilized to promote the album directly. "Lie" was released on July 27, 2009, as a maxi single containing four tracks: "Lie (Part 1)" and "Lie (Part 2)", a ballad rendition of "Lie", and "Wanna Play?". The songs were re-titled for inclusion on Absolute First Album, with "Lie (Part 2)" omitted completely.  A music video was produced for each song: in "Lie (Part 1)", the members are coupled with actor Yoo Seung-ho; "Lie (Part 2)" features the group performing at a waterpark, also known as the "Summer" version. "Lie (Ballad Ver.)" was used to promote the MBC horror series Soul, which stars member Ji-yeon. Actress Lim Ju-eun reprises her role as Ji-yeon's twin sister in the music video. "Wanna Play?" (Norabollae?) showcases T-ara's "powerful" dance skills in "intense" black, white and red. The music video for the song reached 1 million views within two weeks of release.on popular streaming service GOMTV, a record for rookie girl groups.'Through the history of GomTV, not once did a rookie achieve this number of music video streams in a matter of two weeks" said GomTV.

"TTL (Time to Love)" was released on September 15, 2009; a collaboration with T-ara's labelmates Supernova. The two groups formed a project unit consisting of Eun-jung, So-yeon, Hyo-min, and Ji-yeon with Kwang-su, Ji-hyuk, and Geon-il; the single was Supernova's first release in two years. Qri stars in the "TTL (Time to Love)" music video.The song was an instant hit topping all Korean charts upon release including Cyworld's BGM chart and Nate's ringtone chart, its music video reached over 110 thousand views  and climbed up to #1 on the chart within a day of its release and reached over 1,1 million views in its first two weeks of release. The success of "TTL (Time to Love)"  prompted Core Contents Media to produce the sequel entitled "TTL Listen 2" with participation from all members of both groups. Originally set for release on October 13, 2009; "TTL Listen 2" was pushed forward to October 9, 2009, due to the popularity of the original song. The groups performed "TTL Listen 2" for the first time at the annual Dream Concert on October 10, 2009. "TTL Listen 2" was also a commercial success charting on GOMTV's Top popular music videos inly 30 minutes after release with over 50 thousand clicks.

"Bo Peep Bo Peep" and "Like the First Time" were released simultaneously with the album on November 27, 2009. "Bo Peep Bo Peep" was a breakthrough for the group, with its cat dance becoming a craze in the country. The single peaked at number four upon the advent of the Gaon charts in January 2010. "Like the First Time" was successful for T-ara as well, it charted at number ten and both singles sold more than 1.6 million copies each in 2010 alone. The music video for "Like the First Time" features the group transforming member Hyo-min into a "sophisticated" version of herself.

Breaking Heart 
In early February 2010, it was announced that T-ara would be re-releasing their album with two new songs in order to thank their fans for the success of their first album. Entitled Breaking Heart, the reissue centers around a "temptation of the devil" concept. Initial concept photos typo-ed the release as Braking Heart. Breaking Heart was physically released on March 3, 2010, in two editions: a standard, and a first press edition with a 56-page photobook. This edition was limited to 6,000 copies. The album was subsequently released in Taiwan as a CD and DVD package, with pre-orders that include a file folder.

The lead single, "You Drive Me Crazy" (Neo Ttaemune Michyeo), was penned by singer-songwriter Wheesung, with music by Cho Young-soo and Kim Tae-hyun. Robbie Daw of Idolator drew comparisons to American singer Britney Spears, commenting: "the "Womanizer" beat, the "If U Seek Amy" melody and the wardrobe that looks like it was stolen from the storage unit housing the "...Baby One More Time" video shoot memorabilia. [...] You know, the line "you empower me, sexy shadow" is simply just not used enough in pop songs these days. So props for that, T-ara." Filming for the music video, directed by Cha Eun-taek, began on February 18, 2010, in a Namyangju, Gyeonggi studio. Member Ji-yeon suffered a knee ligament injury during its production, causing the other members to end their solo shoots with Ji-yeon finishing hers the next morning. "You Drive me Crazy" peaked at number one on the Gaon Digital Chart; holding its position for two weeks, it sold 3 million copies by the end of 2010 and ranked at number sixteen on the annual chart.

T-ara began dual promotions for their second single, "I'm in Pain"  (Naega Neomu Apa), with the March 11, 2010, broadcast of M! Countdown. It was performed alongside "You Drive Me Crazy", with the music video premiering on March 15, 2010. Two alternate versions of the video were further released, and "I'm in Pain" peaked at number 31 on the Gaon, selling 1.2 million copies by the end of 2010.

Critical reception 
The album has received generally positive reviews. A columnist for Sohu Music marked Absolute First Album as a "clear improvement" over their debut single, yet criticized its lack of identity, opining that though T-ara were able to follow popular trends, they had yet to find a suitable music style. Nevertheless, the reviewer picked "Falling U" as a standout track. In a more negative review, Seo Jung-min of K-pop Archive agreed that their music "can't be considered to have its own grammar", and called the album's sound "mechanical and [simplistic]". Seo further expressed their ambivalence towards girl group hook songs "flooding" the Korean pop music scene in 2009. A writer for Sina Entertainment stated that the album was "full of youthfulness" and "T-ara's color". Similarly, a staff writer for Bugs! remarked that the album "[makes] you feel the charm of T-ara" across its fourteen tracks; singling out the "sweet and refreshing" "Apple is A", and "body shaker" "Tic Tic Toc". Reviewing the Breaking Heart reissue, a Bugs! staff writer calls the album a "turning point showing the essence of fresh electronic music", in addition to naming the album's slower offerings such as "Good Person" and "Falling U" as high quality songs.

Writing for Kpopstarz, Jesse Lent commended "Like the First Time" for its enduring appeal. Lent highlighted the "ethereal restraint" in T-ara's vocals, which "seems to be out of fashion in an industry built on one-upmanship", comparing their technique to that of Kate Bush and Charlotte Gainsbourg. Members Qri, Hyo-min, and Eun-jung have named "Like the First Time" as their all-time favorite track. In 2017, Jacques Peterson of SBS PopAsia named "TTL (Time to Love)", "You Drive Me Crazy" and "Like the First Time" as among the group's best singles. Peterson previously opined that Absolute First Album "still stands as one of the best, if not the best, Korean girl group album of the past five years". In 2018, SBS PopAsia listed Absolute First Album as one of 10 "Essential Modern K-pop Albums You Need to Hear".

In popular culture 
On January 10, 2009, a parody version of "Bo Peep Bo Peep" was performed on South Korean TV show "Family Outing" aired on SBS by Big Bang's Daesung, Jo Han-seon, Yoon Jong-shin, and Kim Su-ro.

Nami Tamaki released a Japanese cover of "TTL (Time to Love)" with Supernova in 2011.

In July 2022, "You Drive Me Crazy" was played in the hit TV series Extraordinary Attorney Woo resulting in the song to go viral in South Korea.

Accolades

Awards and nominations

Music show awards

Lists

Commercial performance 
Absolute First Album recorded 25,000 in pre-orders, ranking number one on the Hanteo real-time charts for three consecutive days. The album peaked at number two on the Gaon album chart. The Breaking Heart re-issue similarly peaked at number two, and sold 40,695 copies by the end of 2010. It has sold 65,030 copies in total as of 2012.

Charts

Track listing

{{Track listing
| headline       = Breaking Heart
| extra_column   = Arrangement
| total_length   = 55:50
| title1         = You Drive Me Crazy 
| note1          = 너 때문에 미쳐, Neo Ttaemune Michyeo
| lyrics1        = Wheesung
| music1         = Cho Young-soo, Kim Tae-hyun
| extra1         = Cho Young-soo, Kim Tae-hyun
| length1        = 
| title2         = I'm in Pain
| note2          = 내가 너무 아파, Naega Neomu Apa| lyrics2        = Shinsadong Tiger, Choi Kyu-sung
| music2         = Shinsadong Tiger, Choi Kyu-sung
| extra2         = Shinsadong Tiger, Choi Kyu-sung
| length2        = 
}}

Notes
 "TTL (Time to Love)" is sometimes stylized as "T.T.L (Time to Love)", though the same is not true of "TTL Listen.2".
 The Breaking Heart reissue is sixteen tracks in total; its two new tracks are appended to the beginning of Absolute First Album.

 Sales 

Personnel
Credits for Absolute First Album'' adapted from liner notes.

 Lee Jae-hyunk – executive producer
 Kwo Chang-hyun – producer

Release history

Notes

References

2009 debut albums
T-ara albums
Stone Music Entertainment albums
Absolute First Album (re-issue)